Daniella Alonso is an American actress and former fashion model. She has appeared in a number of horror films, including The Hills Have Eyes 2 and Wrong Turn 2: Dead End. Alonso was a regular cast member in the NBC post-apocalyptic series Revolution from 2012 to 2013, and the medical drama The Night Shift in 2014. Alonso also appeared in the first season of the TNT crime drama Animal Kingdom in 2016, and in 2019 began starring as Cristal Flores in the third season of The CW prime time soap opera, Dynasty.

Early life
Alonso was born in New York City and is of Puerto Rican, Peruvian and Japanese heritage. She has stated that she "grew up in a pretty much all woman household in NYC", but added that her father, grandfather and uncles had "strong influences" in her life as well. She has a brother. She has participated in karate, in which she holds a fourth level green belt. She loves animals and supports PETA, posing in a 2013 advertising campaign that asked consumers to wear synthetic leather.

Discovered by the Ford Modeling Agency, Alonso began booking jobs for teen magazines like Seventeen, YM, and Teen, which led to her booking commercials for Clairol, Cover girl, Clean and Clear, Kmart, Target, Footlocker, Volkswagen, and others. She has done over thirty national commercials and 20-plus Spanish market advertisements, as well.

Career

In television, Alonso began her career with guest appearances on Law & Order and As the World Turns. She had her first break with a recurring role as Anna Taggaro in Season 2 of The WB drama series One Tree Hill (2004-05). Then she began appearing in horror movies including Hood of Horror (2006), The Hills Have Eyes 2 (2007), Wrong Turn 2: Dead End (2007) and The Collector (2009). She has also had guest appearances in  CSI: Crime Scene Investigation, Private Practice, Rizzoli & Isles and Castle.
 
In 2007, she began a recurring role in the NBC drama series  Friday Night Lights (2007-08) as Carlotta Alonso. In 2010, Alonso starred in the short-lived ABC drama series My Generation.  From 2012 to 2013, she starred in the NBC post-apocalyptic series Revolution as Nora Clayton. Alonso later starred in the first season of another NBC series The Night Shift as Dr. Landry de la Cruz, that aired on the summer of 2014. In 2015, she had a recurring role in the BET drama series Being Mary Jane.

In 2015, Alonso starred in two films; first was Re-Kill a horror film, and the box office hit comedy Paul Blart: Mall Cop 2 opposite Kevin James. In 2016, she starred in the first season of TNT crime drama Animal Kingdom. The following year, she went to star in the ABC drama pilot Las Reinas, but it not was picked up to series. She later had recurring roles on Criminal Minds and The Resident. In 2019, she joined the cast of The CW prime time soap opera Dynasty replacing Ana Brenda Contreras in the role of Cristal Jennings.

Personal life
On November 5, 2020, Alonso said on a podcast that she is pregnant with her first child. She gave birth to a girl in 2021.

Filmography

Film

Television

References

External links

 
 
 

American film actresses
American television actresses
Living people
Actresses from New York City
American film actors of Asian descent
20th-century American actresses
21st-century American actresses
Hispanic and Latino American actresses
Year of birth missing (living people)